Windsor High School is a high school located in Windsor, Colorado, United States. The school is part of the Weld RE-4 School District. It serves about 2,000 students, and employs about 76 faculty members.

Band 
The marching band has won Colorado Bandmasters' Association (CBA) State Competitions in 1991, 1992, 2008, and 2011.

The band was selected to perform for President Barack Obama's inaugural parade on January 20, 2009.

The band was selected to march in the 75th Pearl Harbor Memorial Parade in Hawaii on December 7, 2016, where they received the first place prize in the parade competition.

Sports 
Windsor offers several sports, including football, basketball, swimming, track, lacrosse, golf, and cross country.

The boys' basketball team went to state competition in 1924, and then went on to win the national competition.

2018 addition and renovation 

Windsor High School was remodeled to include a new Innovation Center as well as updates to the other parts of the building. The addition includes space for more hands-on classes as well as meeting current code and ADA regulations. The addition and renovation were made possible by a $104.8 million bond.

References 

Educational institutions in the United States with year of establishment missing
Public high schools in Colorado
Schools in Weld County, Colorado